Igor Torres da Silva (born 11 March 2000), known as Igor Torres, is a Brazilian professional footballer who plays as a forward for Atlético Goianiense, on loan from Fortaleza.

Club career
Born in São Paulo, Igor Torres played futsal for São Paulo FC before representing Santarritense, Atlético Goianiense and Taboão da Serra as a youth. In February 2020, after impressing with the latter in the year's Copa São Paulo de Futebol Júnior, he was loaned to Fortaleza and was assigned to their under-20 squad.

In October 2020, Igor Torres was promoted to the first team by manager Rogério Ceni, and made his senior – and Série A – debut on 19 November, coming on as a late substitute for Marlon in a 0–0 away draw against Vasco da Gama. He scored his first goal the following 10 February, netting the opener in a 3–0 home success over the same opponent.

On 26 February 2021, Igor Torres signed a permanent deal with Fortaleza until 2024, after having 75% of his economic rights bought by the club.

Career statistics

Honours
Fortaleza
 Campeonato Cearense: 2020, 2021, 2022
 Copa do Nordeste: 2022

References

External links
 

2000 births
Living people
Footballers from São Paulo
Brazilian footballers
Association football forwards
Campeonato Brasileiro Série A players
Campeonato Brasileiro Série B players
Fortaleza Esporte Clube players
Esporte Clube Bahia players
Atlético Clube Goianiense players